

Tampa Bay Parenting Magazine is a free monthly magazine featuring content created for and about Tampa Bay area families. Tampa Bay Parenting Magazine is published monthly by Hooray Media Group.

Tampa Bay Parenting Magazine covers a range of family-related topics, including mother and family health, education, activities, summer camp, vacations, fashion, nutrition, and features about local families.

The magazine is distributed free of charge, and it is supported by advertising and local sponsors.

About 
Tampa Bay Parenting Magazine was first published in the spring of 2007 by founding editor Angela Ardolino, who served as editorial director until 2016. The magazine was purchased in 2014 and has been merged into print and digital publisher Hooray Media Group. Local news organizations use Tampa Bay Parenting Magazine as a source for family and parenting topics, including things to do and local activities, family travel, holidays, motherhood and fatherhood, babies, and health. In 2011, Tampa Bay Parenting Magazine started sponsoring an annual Back to School Fair event for local families and schools. Typically occurring about a week before the start of public schools, Back to School Fair coincides with Florida's annual sales-tax-free holiday for school supplies. Approximately 7,000 people attended the 2022 Back to School Fair.

Awards 

Florida Magazine Association Charlie Awards, 2019

 Charlie award (first place) for Best Design: Cover: "June 2018"
 Bronze award for Best Writing: Editorial/Commentary/Opinion: "Delaney's Story"

 Florida Magazine Association Charlie Awards, 2018 --

 Charlie award (first place) for Best Writing: Editorial/Commentary/Opinion: "Where We Stand"
 Silver award for Digital Excellence: Best Video: "MOSI" by Laura Byrne

References

External links 
 Tampa Bay Parenting Magazine - Official website

Magazines published in Florida
Magazines established in 2007
Tampa, Florida
St. Petersburg, Florida
Clearwater, Florida